The Dagshai Jail Museum or Dagshai Central Jail in India was built in 1847, a T-shaped building of local stone masonry with 54 tiny cells. Apart from the Cellular Jail in the Andamans, it is the only other Indian museum which once was a jail.
The structure holds 54 maximum security cells, out of which 16 cells were used for severe punishments. The cells were hardly ventilated and there was no source of natural light. The details of each cell are mentioned on title boards.

History 
The military prison in Dagshai Cantonment is a witness of Mahatma Gandhi's arrival in Himachal Pradesh. Britishers used to keep rogue soldiers in the prison. Mahatma Gandhi spent two days there, not as a prisoner but to meet the Irish prisoners. Gandhi's assassin Nathuram Godse was kept in the prison, he was believed to be the last prisoner of this jail.

It housed 50 prisoners at most, and well after the independence of India it was converted into a museum. The establishment of the museum in 2011 was due to the drive of Kasauli's brigade commander, Brigadier Ananth Narayanan. Anand Sethi, a resident of Dagshai Hills, helped him in the curation of the museum with vintage and archival photographs and other material sourced from India, the U.K. and Ireland.

Dagshai Jail museum was inaugurated by Major General SK Gadeock on 13 October 2011.

Construction and view 
The Dagshai jail was constructed in 1849 at a cost of Rs 72,873. It has 54 maximum security cells, which have a floor area of 8’x12’ and 20-foot high ceilings.

The hamlet was founded in 1847 by the East India Company by securing five villages at no expense from the Maharaja of Patiala.

Gallery

Jail museum 
The museums in the jail compound has old photographs of houses which recreate the history of the place and some memorabilia from the British rule period. The architecture of both the jail and the museum are typical British in green color. It was for prisoners guilty of treachery, who were subjected to cruel chastisement, barricaded windows and doors.

Apart from the jail, there is also the Dagshai Heritage museum. There are photos of steam engines, railway lines, old customs of Dagshai, a brief mention of monkey point and some old notes on what the area was like during the war times.

Other points of interest, nearby places 

 Nobody ever escaped from this jail.
 There is only one VIP cell in the jail.
 Outside the courtyard of the cell, one can see the solid gun-metal fire hydrant made in 1865 in the UK.
 Anand Sethi, a military historian and long-time resident of Dagshai whose father, Balkrishan Sethi was the first Indian to be a Cantonment Executive Officer (1941–42), is the man behind the project who funded it and collaborated with the Indian Army to make the museum.
 Other nearby places are the Old Cemetery which was established in 1845, a Catholic Church and a graveyard. The graveyard dates back to the early 1800s.
 The area around Dagshai has about 11 forts constructed by the Nepalese Gurkhas under General Amar Singh Thapa, when they ruled this part of North India from 1805 to 1816. The fort at Banasar is on a hill South of Dagshai.

References 

Museums in Himachal Pradesh
Prison museums in India
British-era buildings in Himachal Pradesh